This article contains information about the literary events and publications of 1966.

Events
February – The Nottingham-based chain of pharmacy stores Boots UK closes the last of its circulating "Booklovers' Library" branches.
February 10 – Author Jacqueline Susann has her first novel, Valley of the Dolls, published. From a friend she obtains a list of the bookstores on whose sales figures The New York Times relies for its bestseller list. She then uses her own money to buy large quantities of her book at these stores, causing it to head the list. Valley of the Dolls incidentally comes to rank among the best-selling novels of all time.
February 14 – Dissident writers Yuli Daniel and Andrei Sinyavsky are sentenced to hard labour for "anti-Soviet activity".
March 9 – J. R. R. Tolkien writes to Roger Verhulst expressing concerns about a proposed book about him by W. H. Auden, saying, "I regard such things as premature impertinences.... I cannot believe that they have a usefulness to justify the distaste and irritation given to the victim," but adding: "I owe Mr. Auden a debt of gratitude for the generosity with which he has supported and encouraged me since the first appearance of The Lord of the Rings."
March 21 – In a landmark obscenity case, Memoirs v. Massachusetts, the Supreme Court of the United States rules that the hitherto banned novel Fanny Hill (John Cleland's Memoirs of a Woman of Pleasure, 1749) does not meet the Roth Standard for obscenity.
By June – Aleksandr Solzhenitsyn completes his semi-autobiographical novel Cancer Ward («Раковый Корпус», Rakovy Korpus) and sends the manuscript to the Russian literary magazine Novy Mir. The editor, Tvardosky, equivocates and requests cuts, so Solzhenitsyn arranges for it be distributed as samizdat, then to be discussed at a meeting in Moscow of the Central Writers' Club on November 17.
June 14 – The Roman Curia abolishes the Index Librorum Prohibitorum of books banned by the Catholic Church, after 427 years.
June 16 – Blackwell's opens the 930 m2 Norrington Room in their main bookshop in Broad Street, Oxford.
June 23 – Octopussy and The Living Daylights appears as the final collection of James Bond short stories by the character's creator, Ian Fleming, who died in 1964.
July 24 – American poet and critic Frank O'Hara is hit by a dune buggy on Fire Island beach. He dies of his injuries the following day.
August 24 – Tom Stoppard's tragicomedy Rosencrantz and Guildenstern Are Dead is first played, at the Edinburgh Festival Fringe. Despite small audiences, Stoppard's reputation is made by a review by Ronald Bryden in The Observer.
September 8 – The first UNESCO International Literacy Day is celebrated.
September 9 – New Beacon Books, the first Caribbean publishing house in England, releases its first title, Foundations by John La Rose.
October 21 – Jacques Derrida delivers a lecture, La Structure, le signe et le jeu dans le discours des sciences humaines, to a structuralism colloquium at Johns Hopkins University, giving international prominence to his work on literary theory.
November 3–4 – The 1966 flood of the Arno in Florence causes severe damage to libraries, including the National Central Library and Gabinetto Vieusseux.
November 28 – Truman Capote's Black and White Ball ("The Party of the Century") is held in New York City. The guest of honor, The Washington Post publisher Katharine Graham, later says: "Truman called me up that summer and said, 'I think you need cheering up. And I'm going to give you a ball.'...I was...sort of baffled....I felt a little bit like Truman was going to give the ball anyway and that I was part of the props."
December – Moskva magazine begins the first publication of Mikhail Bulgakov's novel The Master and Margarita (Ма́стер и Маргари́та), begun in 1928 but left incomplete on the author's death in 1940. It appears in two parts with portions omitted or altered.
unknown date – The first modern revival of a play by Bhāsa, Madhyamavyayoga, directed by Shanta Gandhi, is performed in a Hindi translation.

New books

Fiction
Chinua Achebe – A Man of the People
Robert H. Adleman (with Col. George Walton) – The Devil's Brigade
Lloyd Alexander – The Castle of Llyr
Elechi Amadi – The Concubine
Kingsley Amis – The Anti-Death League
Isaac Asimov – Fantastic Voyage
Margaret Atwood
The Circle Game
Expeditions
Speeches for Doctor Frankenstein
Louis Auchincloss – The Embezzler
Nigel Balchin – In the Absence of Mrs. Petersen
J. G. Ballard
The Crystal World
The Impossible Man
Henry Bauchau – La Déchirure
John Bingham – The Double Agent
Paul Bowles – Up Above the World
Ray Bradbury – S Is for Space
Victor Canning – Doubled in Diamonds
John Dickson Carr – Panic in Box C
Angela Carter – Shadow Dance
Agatha Christie – Third Girl
James Clavell – Tai-Pan
Robert Crichton – The Secret of Santa Vittoria
Cecil Day-Lewis – The Morning after Death
August Derleth and Mark Schorer – Colonel Markesan and Less Pleasant People
Philip K. Dick
The Crack in Space
Now Wait for Last Year
The Unteleported Man
Allen Drury – Capable of Honor
Friedrich Dürrenmatt – Der Meteor
Shusaku Endo (遠藤 周作) – Silence (沈黙, Chinmoku)
Ian Fleming – Octopussy and The Living Daylights
John Fowles – The Magus
 L.P. Hartley – The Betrayal
Robert A. Heinlein – The Moon Is a Harsh Mistress
Aidan Higgins – Langrishe, Go Down
Robert E. Howard and L. Sprague de Camp – Conan the Adventurer
 Michael Innes – The Bloody Wood
Daniel Keyes – Flowers for Algernon
Anatoly Kuznetsov – Babi Yar: A Document in the Form of a Novel («Бабий яр. Роман-документ»)
 Arthur La Bern – Goodbye Piccadilly, Farewell Leicester Square
J. M. G. Le Clézio – Le Déluge
Violette Leduc – Thérèse et Isabelle
José Lezama Lima – Paradiso
 Audrey Erskine Lindop – I Start Counting
H. P. Lovecraft and Divers Hands – The Dark Brotherhood and Other Pieces
John D. MacDonald – One Fearful Yellow Eye
Compton Mackenzie – Paper Lives
Alistair MacLean – When Eight Bells Toll
Larry McMurtry – Last Picture Show
Bernard Malamud – The Fixer
Marga Minco – Een leeg huis (An empty house)
Gladys Mitchell – The Croaking Raven
Grace Ogot – The Promised Land
Anthony Powell – The Soldier's Art
J. B. Priestley – Salt Is Leaving
Thomas Pynchon – The Crying of Lot 49
Seabury Quinn – Carnacki, the Ghost-Finder
Gerard Reve – Nader tot U (Nearer to Thee)
Jean Rhys – Wide Sargasso Sea
Karl Ristikivi – Rõõmulaul
Tayeb Salih – Season of Migration to the North (موسم الهجرة إلى الشمال, Mawsim al-Hijrah ilâ al-Shamâl)
Giorgio Scerbanenco
A Private Venus
Traitors to All
Leonardo Sciascia – A ciascuno il suo
Paul Scott – The Jewel in the Crown
Aleksandr Solzhenitsyn – Cancer Ward
Adela Rogers St. Johns – Tell No Man
Krishna Sobti – Mitro Marjani (To Hell with you Mitro!)
Rex Stout – Death of a Doxy
William Styron – The Confessions of Nat Turner
Jacqueline Susann – Valley of the Dolls
Leslie Thomas – The Virgin Soldiers
Roderick Thorp – The Detective
Jack Vance – The Eyes of the Overworld
Mario Vargas Llosa – The Green House (La Casa Verde)
Patrick White – The Solid Mandala
Roger Zelazny
The Dream Master
This Immortal

Children and young people
Chinua Achebe – Chike and the River
Rev. W. Awdry – Main Line Engines (twenty-first in The Railway Series of 42 books)
Nina Bawden – The Witch's Daughter
Roald Dahl – The Magic Finger
Leon Garfield – Devil-in-the-Fog
Charles Keeping – Charley, Charlotte and the Golden Canary
Clive King – The 22 Letters
Ruth Park
The Muddle-Headed Wombat at School
The Muddle-Headed Wombat in the Snow
Bill Peet
Capyboppy
Farewell to Shady Glade
Otfried Preußler – The Little Ghost
Tomi Ungerer – Moon Man
Eduard Uspensky – Crocodile Gena and His Friends («Крокодил Гена и его друзья»)
Jill Paton Walsh – Hengest's Tale

Drama
Edward Albee – A Delicate Balance
Barbara Garson – MacBird!
Günter Grass – The Plebeians Rehearse the Uprising (Die Plebejer proben den Aufstand)
Gwenlyn Parry – Saer Doliau (Doll Doctor)
Tom Stoppard – Rosencrantz and Guildenstern Are Dead
Zdeněk Svěrák, Jiří Šebánek and Ladislav Smoljak – Akt (The Nude, introducing the Czech fictional character Jára Cimrman)
Luis Valdez – Quinta Temporada

Poetry

Seamus Heaney – Death of a Naturalist
Anne Sexton – Live or Die

Non-fiction
Geoffrey Blainey – The Tyranny of Distance: How Distance Shaped Australia's History
Dictionary of Canadian Biography, volume 1.
Truman Capote – In Cold Blood (non-fiction novel - book publication)
William Crossing (died 1928) – The Dartmoor Worker (anthology)
L. Sprague de Camp and Catherine Crook de Camp – Spirits, Stars, and Spells
Edward Jay Epstein – Inquest
Margery Fish – An All the Year Garden
Michel Foucault – The Order of Things (Les Mots et les choses: une archéologie des sciences humaines)
Ernst H. Gombrich – Norm and Form. Studies in the Art of the Renaissance
A. E. Hotchner – Papa Hemingway
P. J. Kavanagh – The Perfect Stranger
Mark Lane – Rush to Judgment
Alasdair MacIntyre – A Short History of Ethics
Nancy Mitford – The Sun King
María Moliner – Diccionario de uso del español
Anaïs Nin – The Diary of Anaïs Nin, Volume I: 1931–1934
Arthur M. Schlesinger Jr. – A Thousand Days
Hunter S. Thompson – Hell's Angels: The Strange and Terrible Saga of the Outlaw Motorcycle Gangs
Frances Yates – The Art of Memory

Births
February 14 - Alex Scarrow, British novelist
February 24 – Alain Mabanckou, Francophone Congolese novelist
March 4 – Dav Pilkey, American author and illustrator
March 5 – Mark Z. Danielewski, American fiction author
April 12 – Jim Duffy, Irish political writer
April 15 – Cressida Cowell, English children's writer
April 20 – David Chalmers, Australian philosopher and cognitive scientist
April 26 – Natasha Trethewey, American poet
July 4 – Brian Selznick, American children's writer and illustrator
July 21 – Sarah Waters, Welsh novelist
September 24 – Rhys Hughes, Welsh short-story writer
October 19 – David Vann, Alaskan-born fiction writer and sailor
November 17 – Jane Holland (Victoria Lamb, etc.), English poet and novelist
November 22 – Mónica Montañés, Venezuelan screenwriter and journalist
December 27 – Chris Abani, Nigerian poet and novelist
December 29 – Christian Kracht, Swiss novelist and journalist
unknown date – Helen Zahavi, English novelist and translator

Deaths
January 18 – Kathleen Norris, American novelist (born 1880)
February 12 – Elio Vittorini, Italian novelist (born 1908)
March 10 – Frank O'Connor, Irish short-story writer (born 1903)
April 1 – Brian O'Nolan (Flann O'Brien), Irish satirist (heart attack, born 1911)
April 2 – C. S. Forester, English historical novelist (born 1899)
April 10 (Easter Day) – Evelyn Waugh, English novelist, biographer and travel writer (heart failure, born 1903)
April 13 – Georges Duhamel, French novelist (born 1884)
May 7 – Stanisław Jerzy Lec, Polish aphorist and poet (born 1909)
June 7
Yoshishige Abe, Japanese philosopher and politician (born 1883)
Jean Arp, Alsatian poet, sculptor and painter (born 1886)
June 10 – Henry Treece, English children's historical novelist and poet (born 1911)
June 30 – Margery Allingham, English crime novelist (born 1904)
July 20 – Anne Beffort, Luxembourg literary writer and biographer (born 1880)
July 25 – Frank O'Hara, American poet (ruptured liver, born 1926)
 August 2 or 3 – Tristan Klingsor (Léon Leclère), French fantaisiste poet, painter and musician (born 1874)
August 6 – Cordwainer Smith (Paul Myron Anthony Linebarger), American science fiction author (heart attack, born 1913)
August 12 – Artur Alliksaar, Estonian poet (cancer, born 1923)
September 3 – Fu Lei, Chinese translator (born 1908)
September 14- Dorothy Whipple, English novelist and children's writer (born 1893)
September 25 – Mina Loy, English-born poet and artist (born 1882)
September 28 – André Breton, French Surrealist poet and author (born 1896)
October 30 – Yórgos Theotokás, Greek novelist (born 1906)
November 26 – Siegfried Kracauer, German journalist and critic (born 1889)
December 23 – Heimito von Doderer, Austrian author (born 1896)

Awards
Alfaguara Prize: Manuel Vicent, Pascua y naranjas
Cholmondeley Award: Ted Walker, Stevie Smith
Eric Gregory Award: Robin Fulton, Seamus Heaney, Hugo Williams
See 1966 Governor General's Awards for a complete list of winners and finalists for those awards.
Hugo Award: Frank Herbert, Dune and Roger Zelazny, ...And Call Me Conrad
James Tait Black Memorial Prize for fiction: Christine Brooke-Rose, Such, and Aidan Higgins, Langrishe, Go Down
James Tait Black Memorial Prize for biography: Geoffrey Keynes, The Life of William Harvey
Miles Franklin Award: Peter Mathers, Trap
Nebula Award (first): Samuel R. Delany, Babel–17 and Daniel Keyes, Flowers for Algernon
Newbery Medal for children's literature: Elizabeth Borton de Treviño, I, Juan de Pareja
Nobel Prize in Literature: Shmuel Yosef Agnon, Nelly Sachs
Premio Nadal: Vicente Soto, La zancada
Prix Goncourt: Edmonde Charles-Roux, Oublier Palerme
Prix Médicis: Marie-Claire Blais, Une saison dans la vie d'Emmanuel
Pulitzer Prize for Drama: no award given
Pulitzer Prize for Fiction: Katherine Anne Porter, Collected Stories
Pulitzer Prize for Poetry: Richard Eberhart, Selected Poems
Viareggio Prize: Alfonso Gatto,  La storia delle vittime

References

 
Years of the 20th century in literature